Albania has been divided into prefectures until they became replaced by counties/regions.

10 prefectures around 1925: 
 Berat Prefecture
 Dibër Prefecture
 Durrës Prefecture
 Elbasan Prefecture
 Gjirokastër Prefecture
 Korçë Prefecture
 Kukës Prefecture
 Shkodër Prefecture
 Tirana Prefecture
 Vlonë Prefecture

References

Subdivisions of Albania